A status referendum was held on the island of Saba on 5 November 2004.

Background
After the 1994 referendum came out in favour of maintaining and restructuring the Netherlands Antilles, the government of the Netherlands Antilles tried to restructure the Netherlands Antilles and attempted to forge closer ties between the islands, as is exemplified by the adoption of an anthem of the Netherlands Antilles in 2000. A new referendum on Sint Maarten, which was in favour of a separate status for Sint Maarten as a country within the Kingdom of the Netherlands, sparked a new series of referendums across the Netherlands Antilles, however.

86.05% of the population in Saba voted for closer links to the Netherlands; remaining a part of the Netherlands Antilles got 13.18% of the vote. Independence got less than one percent of the vote.

Results

See also
Dissolution of the Netherlands Antilles
2000 Sint Maarten status referendum
2004 Bonaire status referendum
2005 Curaçao status referendum
2005 Sint Eustatius status referendum

References

Referendums in Saba (island)
Referendums in the Netherlands Antilles
Independence referendums
Saba
Saba
Saba